Depo may refer to:

 Depo-Provera, a birth control injection
 Deposition (law), evidence given under oath for later use in court
 the NASDAQ trading symbol for the company Depomed
 Wacław Depo (born 1953), Roman Catholic bishop

See also
 Depo Hostivař, a station on the Prague Metro
 Depoe Bay, Oregon, a city on the Pacific coast
 Depot (disambiguation), pronounced the same as "depo" in some accents
 Deposition (disambiguation)